In the Flesh may refer to:

Books
 In the Flesh (2009 graphic novel), a collection of stories by Koren Shadmi

Film and TV
 In the Flesh (1998 film), an American gay-themed murder mystery film
 In the Flesh (2003 film), an Indian documentary about prostitution in South Asia
 "In the Flesh" (Star Trek: Voyager), an episode of Star Trek: Voyager
 "In the Flesh", an episode of Xiaolin Showdown
 In the Flesh (TV series), a British supernatural drama series

Music

Albums
 In the Flesh – Live, a live CD and DVD from Roger Waters' In the Flesh tours
 In the Flesh (Johnny Thunders album), a posthumous live CD by Johnny Thunders
 In the Flesh (Nader Sadek album), the debut album from death metal supergroup Nader Sadek

Songs
 "In the Flesh?", two songs from the Pink Floyd album The Wall
 "In the Flesh" (Blondie song), a song on the album Blondie
 "In the Flesh", the second track of Pain of Salvation's album The Perfect Element, Part I

Tours
 In the Flesh (Pink Floyd tour), a 1977 tour by Pink Floyd
 In the Flesh (Roger Waters tour), a series of Roger Waters' tours from 1999 to 2002
 Utada: In the Flesh 2010, a tour by pop singer-songwriter Hikaru Utada